Tangherlini is a surname. Notable people with the surname include:

 Dan Tangherlini (born  1967), former Administrator of the United States General Services Administration
 Frank Tangherlini, physicist who extended the Schwarzschild metric to higher dimensions